Jennifer Canady is an American politician. She serves as a Republican member for the 50th district of the Florida House of Representatives. She serves on the Education and Employment Committee.

Life and career 
Canady was born in Lakeland, Florida. She attended Florida State University and the University of South Florida. She was a teacher.

In 2021, Canady ran as a candidate in the Republican primary election for the 40th district of the Florida House of Representatives. She was unsuccessful. In 2022, Canady defeated Phillip Walker in the Republican primary election for the 50th district. No Democratic candidate was nominated to challenge her in the general election. She succeeded Rene Plasencia.

References 

Living people
Year of birth missing (living people)
People from Lakeland, Florida
Republican Party members of the Florida House of Representatives
21st-century American politicians
21st-century American women politicians
20th-century American women
Florida State University alumni
University of South Florida alumni